The Jardin Balfour is a recreational park, where people exercise, watch tortoises in the tortoise park, or find a peaceful moment. Children come to play in the area provided for them. It is located in the beautiful Beau Bassin.

Renovation
In October 2016, Jardin Balfour had after a very long time undergone renovation work and upgrading to maintain its exotic beauty. Speakers have also been put in place for visitors to enjoy a cool and serene atmosphere, at what is called the Peace Corner

References

External links
 Jardin Balfour on Facebook

Beau Bassin-Rose Hill
Parks in Mauritius